Carol Jean Mays (July 16, 1933 - December 15, 2021) was an American Democrat politician from Independence, Missouri, who served in the Missouri House of Representatives.

Born in Independence, Missouri, she attended the public schools of Kansas City, Missouri, and Baker University, a private university in Baldwin City, Kansas.  She was a restaurant owner in Independence, Missouri.

References

1933 births
2021 deaths
20th-century American politicians
21st-century American politicians
20th-century American women politicians
21st-century American women politicians
Democratic Party members of the Missouri House of Representatives
People from Independence, Missouri
Women state legislators in Missouri